The Esmeralda Provincial Park is a provincial park in the Misiones Province of Argentina.

Location

The Esmeralda Provincial Park is in the department of San Pedro, Misiones.
The park is in the Alto Paraná Atlantic forests ecoregion.
It is the core of the Yabotí Biosphere Reserve, and protects the Arroyo Yabotí basin.
It has rugged terrain with abundant forest.
The park contains the Marcio Ayres Biological Station, which is used by scientists studying biodiversity.

History

The area was established as the Obraje Esmeralda Protected Nature Area by provincial law 2,939 of 1992.
It was made a provincial park by law 3.469 on 1997.
The park would be part of the proposed Trinational Biodiversity Corridor, which aims to provide forest connections between conservation units in Brazil, Paraguay and Argentina in the Upper Paraná ecoregion.

Notes

Sources

Parks in Argentina
1997 establishments in Argentina
Protected areas of Misiones Province
Provincial Parks in Argentina
Protected areas of the Atlantic Forest